Dejan Milosavljev (born 16 March 1996) is a Serbian handball player for German club Füchse Berlin and the Serbia national team.

Career
Milosavljev made his debut for Jugović in the 2011–12 season. He was transferred to Partizan in March 2017. As part of the deal, it was agreed that Milosavljev would initially go on loan to Qatari club Lekhwiya. He helped them win the Amir Cup, before returning to Partizan. In July 2018, Milosavljev signed with Macedonian champions Vardar.

A Serbia international since 2014, Milosavljev participated in the 2019 World Men's Handball Championship.

Honours
Vardar
 Macedonian Handball Super League: 2018–19
 EHF Champions League: 2018–19
 SEHA League: 2018–19

References

External links
 EHF record

1996 births
Living people
Sportspeople from Pančevo
Serbian male handball players
RK Jugović players
RK Partizan players
RK Vardar players
Handball-Bundesliga players
Expatriate handball players
Serbian expatriate sportspeople in Qatar
Serbian expatriate sportspeople in North Macedonia
Serbian expatriate sportspeople in Germany
Mediterranean Games competitors for Serbia
Competitors at the 2018 Mediterranean Games
21st-century Serbian people